Stora Karlsö is an island off the west coast of Gotland, Sweden; part of Eksta socken. It is mostly known for its rich birdlife with large colonies of common guillemot, and flora. Stora Karlsö is a nature reserve, the second oldest in the world after Yellowstone National Park.

Geography 
Most of the island consists of a limestone plateau, bordered by steep cliffs along the shore. It is mostly covered with alvar, with many juniper bushes and some small groves of deciduous trees.

Birds and plants 
The island is mostly known for its rich birdlife and flora. It has large colonies of common guillemot (about 7500 breeding pairs) and razorbill (4500 pairs). In spring, there is an extraordinary number of orchids, mostly elder-flowered orchid and early purple orchid. There are also several very rare plants for Sweden such as Adonis vernalis, Lactuca quercina (called  Karlsösallat in Swedish), hart's-tongue fern and Corydalis gotlandica (the only endemic plant on Gotland).

History 
There is evidence that Stora Karlsö has been inhabited since the Stone Age. During the Middle Ages there was a marble quarry, which gave the material for many of Gotland's churches. The island is a nature reserve, and after Yellowstone National Park is the oldest established protected nature area in the world. From May to August there are tour boats from the village Klintehamn.

The Stora Karlsö Lighthouse was built in 1887. A house for the lighthouse keeper was added in the 1930s, which resulted in the island getting its first permanent residents in modern times. Since 1974, the lighthouse is automated and there are no permanent residents on the island. The lighthouse and the surrounded buildings are now listed.

Gallery

See also 
 Lilla Karlsö
 Svenska Turistföreningen

References

External links 

Gotland
Swedish islands in the Baltic
Lighthouses in Sweden
Biota of Sweden
Geography of Gotland County
Islands of Gotland County
Tourist attractions in Gotland County
Nature reserves in Sweden
1970 establishments in Sweden